The Seventy Islands gecko (Lepidodactylus paurolepis) is a lizard endemic to Palau.

References

Lepidodactylus
Reptiles described in 1995
Endemic fauna of Palau
Reptiles of Oceania